Rosabeth Moss Kanter (born March 15, 1943) is the Ernest L. Arbuckle professor of business at Harvard Business School.  She is also director and chair of the Harvard University Advanced Leadership Initiative.

Early life and education
Kanter was born in Cleveland, Ohio, to Helen (Smolen) Moss, a schoolteacher, and Nelson Nathan Moss, a lawyer and small-business owner. She has a younger sister, Myra. Kanter described her childhood as "benign" and herself as ambitious, having written a novel and entered essay contests as early as 11 years old.

She graduated from Cleveland Heights High School in 1960 and then went on to study sociology and English literature at Bryn Mawr College, graduating magna cum laude in 1964.  The following year she received an MA in sociology and, in 1967, a PhD from the University of Michigan. Her dissertation was on 19th-century utopian communes.  Although Kanter later decided to pursue a career in business research, her training as a sociologist informed her thinking and subsequent work.

Career

Early work teaching
Before joining the Harvard Business School faculty, Kanter was assistant professor of sociology at Brandeis University from 1967 to 1973 and again from 1974 to 1977, visiting associate professor of administration at Harvard University, as well as professor of sociology at Yale University from 1977 to 1986. She served as editor of the Harvard Business Review from 1989 to 1992, the last academic to hold the job.  She is Chair and Director of the Harvard University Advanced Leadership Initiative.

Work as a sociologist
Kanter's earliest work as a sociologist focused on utopian communities and communes in the United States. In her 1972 book, Commitment & Community: Communes and Utopias in Sociological Perspective, she argued that the internal characteristics of a utopian community lead to its success or failure. Kanter defined a "successful" commune as one that lasted for longer than thirty-three years. After surveying ninety-one communal projects from the period between 1780 and 1860, she determined that communal groups such as the Shakers, Amana, and Oneida were among the most successful nineteenth-century communes. To explain their success, Kanter noted these groups' rituals and clear boundaries for membership, as well as the "commitment mechanisms" that utopians utilized: sacrifice, investment, renunciation, communion, mortification and transcendence. She concluded that the more that a utopian community asked of its members, the more cohesive and long-lasting it was.

Kanter has written numerous books on business management techniques, particularly change management; she also has a regular column in the Miami Herald. She is known for her 1977 study of tokenism—how being a minority in a group can affect one's performance due to enhanced visibility and performance pressure. Her study of Men and Women of the Corporation is a classic in critical management studies, bureaucracy analysis and gender studies.

Advising and consulting
She was an economic adviser to Michael Dukakis in his 1988 bid for presidency. Together they wrote a book entitled Creating the future: the Massachusetts comeback and its promise for America, an examination of the Massachusetts Miracle.

Kanter co-founded the consulting firm Goodmeasure Inc. and has served as its chair since 1980. Her consulting clients have included large companies such as IBM, Gap Inc., Monsanto, British Airways, and Volvo.

Recognition
Kanter was awarded a Guggenheim Fellowship in 1975 and the Harvard Business Review's McKinsey Award in 1979. Her book Men and Women of the Corporation won the 1977 C. Wright Mills Award for the year's outstanding book on social issues. In 2001, she received the Scholarly Contributions to Management Award by the Academy of Management and, one year later, the Intelligent Community Forum's  Intelligent Community Visionary of the Year Award. She holds 23 honorary degrees from various colleges and universities. Her first honorary degree was awarded to her in 1978 by Yale University and her most recent, 23rd degree comes from Aalborg University in Denmark.

The Rosabeth Moss Kanter Award is given in recognition of the best piece of work-family research. The award was created by the Center for Families at Purdue University and the Center for Work and Family at Boston College in honor of Kanter.

She was the top-ranking woman—No. 11 overall—in a 2002 study of Top Business Intellectuals by citation in several sources. She was named one of the "50 most powerful women in Boston" by Boston Magazine and one of the "125 women who changed our world" over the past 125 years by Good Housekeeping magazine in May 2010.

Personal life
Kanter's first husband, Stuart A. Kanter, whom she had married in her junior year at Bryn Mawr, died in 1969.  She married consultant Berry Stein in 1972.  Together they have one son.

Management theory 
Business.com described Rosabeth Kanter's theory of management as establishing a framework managers can utilize to enhance the efficiency of corporate organizations. One of her theories suggested the manner by which a company operates influences attitudes of the work force. Kanter says employees show a variety of behaviors depending on whether structural support was in position. Her view is power emanates from informal and formal sources. Employees must have access to available resources to accomplish the organization's objectives. It is also essential to promote the staff's skills and comprehension.

One article in Management Today cited Rosabeth Kanter as “probably the first woman to attain indisputable management guru status.” Aside from her expertise in change management, Kanter has interests in corporate strategies, self-confidence, and demographic shift. She has a fondness for conducting detailed research therefore earning the pseudonym, “The Thinking Woman’s Michael Porter.”

An article published in the San Diego Tribune on May 29, 2018, mentioned the Harvard professor's idea the happiest employees can solve the most difficult problems and make a positive change in the lives of people. Teachers must adopt this stance if they want to stay in the teaching profession for many years.

In an interview with the Business Insider in 2015, Professor Kanter deplored the “miserable state of America's infrastructure which impaired the economy and affected American citizens. According to the management expert, the blame must be put on federal and local politicians as well as Americans who elect them. Kanter emphasized the need for citizens to pay their taxes in sales, tourism, and usage. Likewise, it is imperative to market investments in infrastructure effectively. However, it is not the government's job alone in building and promoting infrastructure. Entrepreneurs, technology, and collaboration between the public and private sectors are also important.

Selected bibliography

  Pdf from Norges Handelshøyskole (NHH), the Norwegian School of Economics.

Kanter, Rosabeth Moss (1 January 1995). World Class: Thriving Locally in the Global Economy. Simon & Schuster. ISBN 978-0684811291.

Kanter, Rosabeth Moss (28 January 2020). Think Outside the Building: How Advanced Leaders Can Change the World One Smart Innovation at a Time. Public Affairs .

References

External links

"An Interview with Rosabeth Moss Kanter" in Strategy+Business, July 1999.
"Rosabeth Moss Kanter – The professor as business leader". Interview in the Ivey Business Journal, March/April 2006.
Leading Positive Change with Six Steps. Speech at a TEDx event, January 2013.

1943 births
American women economists
Economists from Ohio
Harvard Business School faculty
Living people
Bryn Mawr College alumni
University of Michigan College of Literature, Science, and the Arts alumni
Intelligent Community Forum
21st-century American economists
Cleveland Heights High School alumni
21st-century American women